Chamaraja Road or Chamarajendra double Road is an important main street in downtown Mysore city, Karnataka state, India.

Location 
Chamaraja Road is located on the southern side of the city center.  Other important roads like Kantharaja Urs Road, Krishnaraja Boulevard Road, Jhansi Lakshmi Bai Road, Dewan's Road, Narayana Shastry Road, Thyagaraja Road, Sayyajirao Road, Ramanuja Road and Uttaradhi Mutt Road connect with it and the road terminates with Mysore-Ooty Road near JSS Circle.

Chamaraja Road begins at Kantharaja Urs Road near Fire Brigade circle of Saraswathipuram. It passes the southern side of the Freedom fighters Park and has many landmarks en route.

Important landmarks 
 University Engineering Division
 Muslim Hostel complex
 Arasu Boaarding school ground
 University Pavilion ground
 Maharajas degree college
 Maharajas degree college Hostel
 Sitaraghava press and pharmaceuticals
 Freedom fighters Park
 Jetty Hospital
 Lakshmi Theatre
 Gayathri Theatre
 Sahakara Bhavan
 Sanskrit Pathashala
 Public offices building
 Basaveshwara Circle
 JSS Mahavidyapeetha
 JSS Circle

Length 
Dewan's Road is about 2.2 kilometers in length.

History 
Chamaraja double road is named after Chamaraja Wodeyar X, Maharaja of Mysore GCSI (1863–1894; r. 1868–94) CI (1866–1934; Regent of Mysore: 30 December 1894 – 8 August 1902).

Post office 
The Postal Index Number of Chamaraja double Road is 570004 as it comes under Mysore Fort Post Office.

See also 

 Devaraj Urs Road, Mysore

References 

Suburbs of Mysore
Roads in Mysore
Mysore South